Cameron Kamalani Friel is an American football quarterback for the UNLV Rebels.

Early life and high school career
Born in Honolulu, Hawaii, Friel attended Kailua High School where he threw 22 touchdowns and over 1,700 yards. He was a three-star prospect and committed to UNLV, enrolling in January 2021.

College career
Friel began his true freshman season as backup quarterback, but was named starter for week three against Iowa State, completing 7 of 12 passes for 55 yards and one interception in the 3–48 loss. He then started the following eight games before suffering a season-ending injury, finishing his first year of college football with 1,608 passing yards and six touchdowns, while completing 62.4 percent of his throws, which placed third all-time for any UNLV player. At the end of the year, Friel was named Mountain West Conference Freshman of the Year.

References

Living people
Players of American football from Hawaii
American football quarterbacks
UNLV Rebels football players
People from Maui County, Hawaii
Year of birth missing (living people)